Abdylla Gurbannepesov is a Turkmen professional futsal and former soccer player. He is currently a member of Migrasiya futsal club in the Turkmenistan Futsal League. Captain of Turkmenistan national futsal team.

Biography 
Employee of the State Migration Service of Turkmenistan.

Football career 
As part of the FC Altyn Asyr won the 2009 Turkmenistan Cup, scored one goal in the final match against FC Merw (3:0).

In 2010 he played for the FC HTTU in Ýokary Liga and AFC President's Cup.

Futsal career 
In recent years he has been playing for the futsal club Migrasiya. He became the winner of the Futsal Cup of Turkmenistan 2019 and the best player of the tournament.

International career 
He was involved in the national football team of Turkmenistan for games at Ho Chi Minh City Cup in Vietnam. Gurbannepesow made his senior national team debut on 20 October 2009 against Vietnami, coming to the substitution at the 46 minute. The last call for football national team received in 2011.

He played for Turkmenistan futsal team at 2017 Asian Indoor and Martial Arts Games.

As a captain of the futsal team of Turkmenistan, participated in the final draw of 2020 AFC Futsal Championship.

Honours
Turkmenistan Cup:
Winner: 2009

Turkmenistan Futsal Cup:
Winner: 2019

Turkmenistan Futsal Championship:
Runner-up: 2018

References 

Living people
Futsal forwards
Turkmenistan footballers
Association football midfielders
1985 births
Turkmenistan international footballers